Zinc finger protein ZIC2 is a protein that in humans is encoded by the ZIC2 gene. ZIC2 is a member of the Zinc finger of the cerebellum (ZIC) protein family.

Function 

ZIC2 is classified as a ZIC protein due to conservation of the five C2H2 zinc fingers, which enables the protein to interact with DNA and proteins.

Clinical significance 

Correct function of these proteins is critical for early development, and as such mutations of the genes encoding these proteins is known to result in various congenital defects. For example, mutation of ZIC2 is known to result in holoprosencephaly due to defect in the function of the organizer region (node),  which leads to a defective anterior notochord (ANC). The ANC provides a maintenance signal to the Prechordal plate (PCP), thus a defective ANC results in degradation of the PCP, which is normally responsible for sending a shh signal to the developing forebrain resulting in the formation of the two hemispheres.  Holoprosencephaly is the most common structural anomaly of the human forebrain.

Recently ZIC2 has also been shown to be critical for establishment of the left-right axis, thus loss of ZIC2 function can result in defects in heart formation. Another member of the ZIC family, ZIC3, has previously been linked to establishment of the left-right axis.

A polyhistidine tract polymorphism in this gene may be associated with increased risk of neural tube defects (spina bifida). This gene is closely linked to a gene encoding ZIC5, a related family member on chromosome 13.

Interactions 

ZIC2 has recently been found to interact with TCF7L2, enabling it to act as a Wnt/β-catenin  signalling inhibitor. Such a role is of critical importance, as not only is correct Wnt signalling critical for early development, Wnt signalling has also been found to be upregulated to several cancers. ZIC2 has also been shown to interact with GLI3.

References

Further reading